Fissurina astroisidiata is a species of lichen in the family Graphidaceae. Found in Veracruz, Mexico, it was described as new to science in 2011.

References

Lichen species
Lichens described in 2011
Lichens of Mexico
Ostropales
Taxa named by Robert Lücking